Islam: Past, Present and Future is a 2007 book by prominent theologian Hans Küng. It is the final book in his trilogy on three monotheistic faiths. It is a lengthy analysis of Islam's 1,400-year history.

External links 

 
 Oneworld Publications (includes sample chapter)
 Interview Daily News Egypt

2007 non-fiction books
History books about Islam